Maboga is an administrative ward in the Iringa Rural District of the Iringa Region of Tanzania. Maboga ward consist of 3 villages kiponzero, Magunga and Makongati.

In 2016 the Tanzania National Bureau of Statistics report there were 8,739 people in the ward, from 12,642 in 2012.

Villages / vitongoji 
The ward has 3 villages and 26 vitongoji.

 Magunga
 Ihami
 Lugailo
 Mgogondele A
 Mgogondele B
 Minyala
 Nguvukazi
 Makongati
 Ikondo
 Ilalasimba
 Ilembula
 Kibaoni
 Lukali
 Lunguya
 Lutemi
 Luwinda
 Msasani
 Kiponzelo
 Gendawuye
 Kanisani
 Lumumba
 Madukani
 Mjimwema
 Mkwawa
 Msalasi
 Msombe
 Ngongwa
 Shuleni
 Siyovelwa

References 

Wards of Iringa Region
Constituencies of Tanzania